Kew Gardens station or Kew Gardens railway station could refer to:

Kew Gardens station (London)
Kew Gardens railway station (Merseyside)
Kew Gardens (LIRR station)
Kew Gardens–Union Turnpike (IND Queens Boulevard Line)

See also
 Botanical Garden (disambiguation) § Transport